Christoph Hemlein (born 16 December 1990) is a German professional footballer who plays as a winger for SV Meppen.

Career
Hemlein made his Bundesliga debut for VfB Stuttgart on 22 October 2011 against 1. FC Nürnberg. Four days later, he scored in the second round of the 2011–12 DFB-Pokal against FSV Frankfurt his first goal for the first team of VfB Stuttgart.

On 15 May 2013, Hemlein signed a contract until June 2016 with Eredivisie club NEC.

After the relegation of NEC, Hemlein left the side and signed with Arminia Bielefeld which then played in the German 3. Liga.

In July 2020, Hemlein joined SV Meppen, after his contract with league rivals 1. FC Kaiserslautern had expired.

References

External links
 
 

1990 births
Living people
Sportspeople from Heidelberg
German footballers
Footballers from Baden-Württemberg
Association football wingers
Bundesliga players
2. Bundesliga players
3. Liga players
Eredivisie players
VfB Stuttgart players
VfB Stuttgart II players
NEC Nijmegen players
Arminia Bielefeld players
1. FC Kaiserslautern players
SV Meppen players
German expatriate footballers
German expatriate sportspeople in the Netherlands
Expatriate footballers in the Netherlands